The following buildings were added to the National Register of Historic Places as part of the 'Sarasota Multiple Resource Area (or MPS).

References

 Sarasota
National Register of Historic Places Multiple Property Submissions in Florida